Antonis Vardis (7 August 1948 – 2 September 2014) was a Greek composer and singer.

Born in Moschato, a suburb of Athens, Vardis established a 40-year career as a composer and singer, collaborating with well-known Greek singers: George Dalaras, Yiannis Parios, Vasilis Papakonstantinou, Haris Alexiou, Dimitra Galani, and Anna Vissi.

In 1997 he collaborated with Austrian musician Gert Steinbäcker (S.T.S.), when he sung parts of the song O xenos.

During the 1990s and 2000s he worked as a composer with popular singers such as Keti Garbi, Antonis Remos, Natassa Theodoridou, Giannis Ploutarhos and others.

Death
In 2013, Vardis was diagnosed with cancer. He was transferred to Hanover, Germany, to undergo surgery, which was later described as successful. However, he died on 2 September 2014 at Hygeia Hospital in Athens. He was 66 years old. He was survived by his wife and their two children.

Personal discography
1978 - Οραματίζομαι
1986 - Συγκάτοικοι είμαστε όλοι στην τρέλα
1988 - Tragoudame mazi (Cooperation with Christina Maragozi)
1990 - Leuki isopalia
1993 - Koini gnomi
1995 - Stin Ellas tou 2000
1997 - Oikogeneiaki ypothesi
1999 - Xediplonontas tis skepseis mou
2000 - Ta kalytera mas hronia, einai tora
2002 - Hamogelase psyhi mou
2003 - Oti eho sto harizo
2010 - Stin akri tou oneirou

Compilations
 Ston Megisto Vathmo (2001)
 Oi Filoi Mou Ke Ego (2005)
 Oti Agapisame (2006)
 Ta Onira Mas (2008)

References

External links

1948 births
2014 deaths
Musicians from Athens
Greek songwriters
20th-century Greek male singers
Singers from Athens
Deaths from cancer in Greece
21st-century Greek male singers